Leiocephalus raviceps, commonly known as the pallid curlytail or mountain curlytail lizard, is a species of lizard in the family Leiocephalidae (curly-tailed lizard). It is native to Cuba.

References

Leiocephalus
Reptiles described in 1863
Reptiles of Cuba
Taxa named by Edward Drinker Cope
Endemic fauna of Cuba